Bonaventura College Burggravenlaan is one of four secondary schools that make up the Bonaventura College in Leiden, Netherlands. The name "Burggravenlaan" is derived from the street in which the school is based. The school offers education at vmbo-tl, havo and vwo (both atheneum and gymnasium) level.

The school is officially noted as Roman Catholic.

Bonaventuracollege Burggravenlaan currently consists of two buildings; the original and a new building built on the schoolyard in 2001. The older and the newer part are linked together by a corridor supported by pillars.

The school also hosts an annual Model United Nations-conference named BonaMUN.

Di Fidanza is the schoolpaper completely made by students, for the students. Set up by prior editor-in-chiefs Lilian Dirks and Carina de Bruin in 2009.

On 28 September 2009, the school was evacuated because of a threat for an explosion. The students were let back into the school that same day.

Schools in South Holland